Zofenopril (INN) is a medication that protects the heart and helps reduce high blood pressure. It is an angiotensin-converting enzyme (ACE) inhibitor.

In small studies, zofenopril appeared significantly more effective in reducing hypertension than two older antihypertensive drugs, atenolol and enalapril, and was associated with fewer adverse effects.

Zofenopril is a prodrug with zofenoprilat as the active metabolite.

It was patented in 1978 and approved for medical use in 2000.

References 

ACE inhibitors
Carboxamides
Enantiopure drugs
Prodrugs
Pyrrolidines